Michael Denkha is an Assyrian-Australian actor known for his roles in Get Rich Quick, Stealth, The Combination, Down Under and, most recently, Here Come the Habibs TV series.

Biography

Born in Tehran Iran, Denkha moved to Australia at a young age, where he pursued a career in acting. Denkha, who is of Assyrian ethnicity, graduated from Australia's National Institute of Dramatic Art (NIDA) with a degree in performing arts (acting) in 1995.

His first known appearance on television was on the 1996 TV series Police Rescue. As the years followed, Denkha played roles in Water Rats, Stingers, All Saints and a number of TV shows throughout his career.  In 2005 he played a small role in the American, Australian and New Zealand, production movie  Stealth, before being credited for his work on the 2009 Australian drama film The Combination and the 2016 comedy film Down Under.

In 2016, Denkha was chosen to play a leading role as Fou Fou Habib in the Channel 9 comedy show Here Come the Habibs.

Filmography

Films
 Whipping Boy (TV movie) (1996) as Komras 
 Jimmy (short film) (1998) as Jimmy
 Risk (2000) as Hospital Husband
 The Postcard Bandit (TV movie) (2003) as Pippos 
 Temptation (TV movie) (2003) as Joey
 Get Rich Quick (2004) as Felix
 The Alice (TV movie) (2004) as Motorcycle Cop
 Son of the Mask (2005) as Animator
 Stealth (2005) as Naval Controller
 Small Claims: The Reunion (TV movie) (2006) as Vet
 Extremists (short film) (2008)
 The Combination (2009) as Ibo
Vafadar (short film) (2009) as Amir
 The Nothing Men (2010) as Vince
 Down Under (2016) as Ibrahim
 6 Days (2017) as Kartouti

TV
 Police Rescue (1996) (1 episode) as First Mate
 Water Rats (1997-2001) (2 episodes) as Chicka Canter / Terry Brown
 Wildside (1998) (1 episode) as Steve
 All Saints (1998-2009) (4 episodes) as Mario Constantine / Toby/ Brice Ahearne 
 Murder Call (1999) (1 episode) as Carlo
 Stingers (1999-2004) (2 episodes) as Bruno Zamarto / Monday
 Grass Roots (2000) (2 episodes) as Ewan McCrum
 Head Start (miniseries) (2001) (1 episode) as Tom
 Young Lions (miniseries) (2002) (2 episodes) as Paco
 Blue Heelers (2003) (1 episode) as Kris Torossian 
 White Collar Blue (2002-2003) (3 episodes) as Marinade
 The Alice (2005) (1 episod) as Boyfriend 
 Home and Away (2006) (2 episodes) as Steve Harmer
 Chandon Pictures (2007) (1 episode) as Andrew 
 East West 101 (2009) as Akmal Fahd
 At Home with Julia (2011) as Jesus, the cleaner
 Devil’s Playground (miniseries) (2014) as Massimo Drago
 The Code (2014-2016) as Nasim Parande
 Catching Milat (miniseries) (2015) as Des Butler
 The Principal (miniseries) (2015) as Mohammad Ahmad
 Black Comedy (2016) as Self/Guest
 Rake (2016) as Roy / Thommo 
 Soul Mates (2016) as Eli
 Here Come the Habibs! (2016-2017) as Fou Fou Habib
 Blue Murder: Killer Cop (miniseries) (2017) as Bill Jalalaty
Blood Orange (2017) as Police Officer
Sando (miniseries) (2018) as Mikal
 On the Ropes (2018) (miniseries) as Ahmad
 How to Stay Married (2018) as Amir Essa 
 Secret City: Under the Eagle (2019) as Michael Lavelle
 Hardball (2019-2021) as Jim
 Operation Buffalo (2020) as Doug
 Wolf Like Me (2022) as Taxi Driver

References



Living people
Australian male television actors
Australian people of Assyrian descent
Iranian emigrants to Australia
Year of birth missing (living people)